The following is a list of Registered Historic Places in Genesee County, Michigan.



|}

Former listings

|}

See also

List of Michigan State Historic Sites in Genesee County, Michigan
National Register of Historic Places listings in Michigan
 Listings in neighboring counties: Lapeer, Livingston, Oakland, Saginaw, Shiawassee, Tuscola

References

Genesee County
Genesee County, Michigan
Buildings and structures in Genesee County, Michigan